Li Yuanyi (born 28 August 1993) is a Chinese footballer who currently plays for Shenzhen in the Chinese Super League.

Club career
Li Yuanyi started his football career when he received organized football training at Mingyu Football School, later joining Tianjin Teda's youth academy in 2007. He soon gained a loan spell to Premier League side Arsenal's academy for further training under a cooperation project between Nike and the Football Association in 2010. Afterwards, Li went to Portugal as a part of the Chinese Football Association's 500.com Stars Project in 2011. He arrived in Portugal on 16 December 2011 and played for Real SC's youth academy alongside Ruan Yang.

In July 2012, Li transferred to Segunda Divisão side Casa Pia. He made his debut on 28 October 2012 for the club in a 2-1 loss against Oriental Lisboa, coming on as a substitute for André Oliveira in the 34th minute; however, he was sent off after receiving two successive yellow cards in the 56th and 58th minute in his debut match. He gradually became a starter within the team and scored his first goal for the club on 13 January 2013 in a 1-1 draw against A.D. Carregado. He made 15 league appearances and scored four goals in the 2012-13 season.

On 23 August 2013, Li transferred to another Segunda Divisão club Boavista on a free transfer. However, his former club Tianjin claimed that Li was still under the contract with Tianjin and refused to acknowledge the transfer, but the dispute was quickly resolved. He made his debut for the club on 15 September 2013 in a 1-0 win against S.C. Coimbrões, coming on as a substitute for João Beirão in the 82nd minute. He scored his first goal for the club on 6 October 2013 in a 2-0 win against F.C. Perafita.

On 7 August 2014, after Boavista returned to the Primeira Liga, Li was loaned out to Segunda Liga side Leixões. He made his debut for the club on 13 September 2014 in a 2-1 win against C.D. Aves, coming on as a substitute for Leandro Augusto in the 70th minute. He extended his loan deal with Leixões for one season on 6 July 2015.

On 16 July 2015, Li transferred to Chinese Super League side Guangzhou Evergrande; however, he remained with Leixões to fulfill his loan deal before joining Guangzhou in December 2015. He made his debut for the club on 19 April 2016 in a 2-0 win against Pohang Steelers in the 2015 AFC Champions League, coming on as a substitute for Ricardo Goulart in the 53rd minute. On 15 July 2016, Li was loaned to fellow top tier side Tianjin Teda until 31 December 2016. He made his debut and scored his first goal for the club on 23 July 2016 in a 3-1 loss to Hangzhou Greentown. In February 2017, Li permanently transferred to Tianjin Teda.

On 27 February 2019, Li transferred to fellow top tier side Shenzhen. He would go on to make his debut for Shenzhen in a league game against Hebei China Fortune F.C. on the 2 March 2019 in a 3-1 victory.

Career statistics
.

Honours

Club
Guangzhou Evergrande
Chinese FA Super Cup: 2016

References

External links
 

1993 births
Living people
Chinese footballers
Footballers from Sichuan
People from Deyang
Association football midfielders
Liga Portugal 2 players
Chinese Super League players
Leixões S.C. players
Boavista F.C. players
Guangzhou F.C. players
Tianjin Jinmen Tiger F.C. players
Shenzhen F.C. players
Chinese expatriate footballers
Expatriate footballers in Portugal
Chinese expatriate sportspeople in Portugal